Kathryn Graf (born Kathryn MacDonald, August 13, 1958) is an American actress and playwright.

She guest starred in Police Academy 5: Assignment Miami Beach and has also guest starred in ER and in the Star Trek: Deep Space Nine episode "A Man Alone".

She was married to actor David Graf.

Filmography
 Police Academy 5: Assignment Miami Beach (1988) - Stewardess #1

References

External links 
 
 {kathryngraf.com}
 Variety magazine
 Backstage magazine 
 review

American film actresses
American television actresses
1958 births
Living people
21st-century American women